Nazor is a surname. Notable people with the surname include:

 Ante Nazor (born 1978), Croatian basketball coach
 Vladimir Nazor (1876–1949), Croatian poet and politician

See also
 

Croatian surnames